Singles are a type of music release that typically have fewer tracks than an extended play or an album. For the first three years of the 1980s the UK Singles Chart was compiled by the British Market Research Bureau (BMRB) who had been compiling the charts throughout the 1970s. On 8 January 1983 Gallup took over the compilation of the UK music charts and continued to provide the chart data for the next eleven years. The charts were produced from the sales data of a representative panel of around 500 record shops across the country. The "panel sales" data from each shop were sent to the chart compilers were week and a multiplication factor was then applied to obtain an estimate of total sales across the country. Under the BMRB this sales data was posted to the chart compilers, but when Gallup took over they automated the system by installing computer terminals in the shops that registered each sale and sent the information to Gallup immediately.

The best-selling singles of the 1980s were compiled for Gallup by chart statisticians Alan Jones and Bob Macdonald. They were first revealed on BBC Radio 1 on 1 January 1990, with the "Top 80 of the 80s" counted down and played between 12:35 p.m. and 6:30 p.m. by DJs Alan Freeman and Mark Goodier. The top eighty best-selling singles of the decade were also printed in the music magazine Record Mirror in the issue dated 6 January 1990. However, in the following week's issue a correction was published stating that two singles had been omitted from the chart in error, caused by "computer storage problems at Gallup". The two singles were "Blue Monday" by New Order which should have been at number 13, and "Like a Virgin" by Madonna which should have been at number 53. The chart was then expanded to a top 100, including the two corrections, and published in Guinness Hits of the 80s later in 1990.

The 19 September 2009 issue of the UK music trade magazine Music Week included a special supplement to celebrate its 50th anniversary. It contained updated charts of the top twenty best-selling singles of each decade of the magazine's existence, based on the most recent information available from the Official Charts Company (OCC). The top twenty chart for the 1980s comprised the same twenty singles as the chart published in 1990, but "Blue Monday" was placed at number 12 and "Eye of the Tiger" at number 13.

The 1984 charity single "Do They Know It's Christmas?" by Band Aid was the best-selling single of the decade, and also became the biggest selling single of all time in the UK. It kept this title until 1997, when Elton John's "Candle in the Wind 1997"/"Something About the Way You Look Tonight" overtook it.

At number six is Wham! with "Last Christmas"/"Everything She Wants", which is the highest selling number two hit of the 1980s and was formerly the highest selling single not to top the chart (before it finally reached number one in 2021). In total, there were 20 non-number one singles in the Top 100 (eight of these in the bottom ten), including the biggest selling number three single "Blue Monday" by New Order.

Jennifer Rush at number nine with "The Power of Love" became the first female artist ever to have a million-selling single in the UK. Wham!, David Bowie, John Lennon and Adam and the Ants have three singles in the Top 100, while Frankie Goes to Hollywood, Stevie Wonder, Culture Club, Dexys Midnight Runners, Kylie Minogue, Lionel Richie, Madonna, Cliff Richard, Shakin' Stevens, Bucks Fizz, Michael Jackson, Ottawan and Paul McCartney all have two.

Chart

Notes:

References

1980s in British music
British music-related lists
1980s